Tetsumasa (written: 哲昌 or 徹正) is a masculine Japanese given name. Notable people with the name include:

, Japanese footballer
, Japanese sprint canoeist

Japanese masculine given names